George Reggie "Little George" Amick (October 24, 1924 – April 4, 1959) was an American racecar driver, mainly competing in the American National Championship. He was killed in a crash in a USAC  race at Daytona International Speedway.

Racing career
Amick began racing in jalopies in the Northwestern United States before switching to midget car racing. He competed in USAC National midgets for three seasons, finishing in the top ten points each season, and won 16 feature races. He totaled 38 wins including the 1957 Turkey Night Grand Prix.

He moved to Indy cars and won three times in 43 starts. In his rookie appearance at the Indianapolis 500 in 1958, Amick was assigned a "lay-down" roadster commissioned by car owner Norm Demler, designed by Quinn Epperly, and built by master Indianapolis chief mechanic George Salih. Amick found himself running a comfortable second to leader Jimmy Bryan with just 20 laps remaining. Demler and Salih felt Amick was in a position to catch Bryan and perhaps even win, but decided against pushing their rookie driver into a potentially fatal mistake, and Amick came home an easy second. He was named the 1958 Indianapolis 500 Rookie of the Year.

Death
Amick was competing in the only Indy Car race ever run at the Daytona International Speedway and was killed in an accident on the final lap.
He is buried at Crown Hill Cemetery in Indianapolis.

Awards
Amick was inducted into the National Midget Auto Racing Hall of Fame in 2009.

Complete AAA/USAC Championship Car results

Indianapolis 500 results

Complete Formula One World Championship results
(key)

References

 

1924 births
1959 deaths
United States Navy personnel of World War II
Burials at Crown Hill Cemetery
Indianapolis 500 drivers
Indianapolis 500 Rookies of the Year
People from Columbia County, Oregon
Racing drivers from Oregon
Racing drivers who died while racing
Sports deaths in Florida
United States Navy sailors